The Persian poem The Conference of the Birds by Sufi poet Farid ud-Din Attar has received several stage adaptations, including by Falk Richter as a musical (2018), Sholeh Wolpé as a stage play (2018), ANIKAYA Dance Theater as dance (2018), and  Peter Brook and Jean-Claude Carrière as a stage play. (1977).

Origin 
In the poem, the birds of the world gather to decide who is to be their sovereign, as they have none. The hoopoe, the wisest of them all, suggests that they should find the legendary Simorgh. The hoopoe leads the birds, each of whom represents a human fault which prevents human kind from attaining enlightenment.

The hoopoe tells the birds that they have to cross seven valleys in order to reach the abode of Simorgh. These valleys are as follows:

 1.	Valley of the Quest, where the Wayfarer begins by casting aside all dogma, belief, and unbelief.
 2.	Valley of Love, where reason is abandoned for the sake of love.
 3.	Valley of Knowledge, where worldly knowledge becomes utterly useless.
 4.	Valley of Detachment, where all desires and attachments to the world are given up. Here, what is assumed to be “reality” vanishes.
 5.	Valley of Unity, where the Wayfarer realizes that everything is connected and that the Beloved is beyond everything, including harmony, multiplicity, and eternity.
 6.	Valley of Wonderment, where, entranced by the beauty of the Beloved, the Wayfarer becomes perplexed and, steeped in awe, finds that he or she has never known or understood anything.
 7.	Valley of Poverty and Annihilation, where the self disappears into the universe and the Wayfarer becomes timeless, existing in both the past and the future.

Sholeh Wolpé writes, "When the birds hear the description of these valleys, they bow their heads in distress; some even die of fright right then and there. But despite their trepidations, they begin the great journey. On the way, many perish of thirst, heat or illness, while others fall prey to wild beasts, panic, and violence. Finally, only thirty birds make it to the abode of Simorgh. In the end, the birds learn that they themselves are the Simorgh; the name “Simorgh” in Persian means thirty (si) birds (morgh). They eventually come to understand that the majesty of that Beloved is like the sun that can be seen reflected in a mirror. Yet, whoever looks into that mirror will also behold his or her own image.":17-18

 If Simorgh unveils its face to you, you will find 
 that all the birds, be they thirty or forty or more,
 are but the shadows cast by that unveiling.
 What shadow is ever separated from its maker? 
 Do you see?
 The shadow and its maker are one and the same, 
 so get over surfaces and delve into mysteries.

Attar's masterful use of symbolism is a key, driving component of the poem. This adroit handling of symbolisms and allusions can be seen reflected in these lines:

It was in China, late one moonless night, The Simorgh first appeared to mortal sight – Beside the symbolic use of the Simorgh, the allusion to China is also very significant. According to Idries Shah, China as used here, is not the geographical China, but the symbol of mystic experience, as inferred from the Hadith (declared weak by Ibn Adee, but still used symbolically by some Sufis): "Seek knowledge; even as far as China". There are many more examples of such subtle symbols and allusions throughout the Mantiq. Within the larger context of the story of the journey of the birds, Attar masterfully tells the reader many didactic short, sweet stories in captivating poetic style.

Musical by Falk Richter
In the Netherlands Falk Richter made a music theatre script based on the poem, which was performed in summer 2018 in Leeuwarden (one of the two European Capitals of Culture that year). The play was part of the activities of Leeuwarden-Fryslân 2018. Hundreds of Frisian amateur musicians played during the spectacle, as well as the musician Eric Vloeimans, and dancers and actors of Noord Nederlands Toneel and Club Guy & Roni. The music of the play was composed by Sytze Pruiksma; director was Guy Weizman.

The play was part of the project "King of the meadows" (Kening fan ‘e Greide) around the threatened position of the Black-tailed godwit

The play aimed to address three issues: the deterioration of nature, the importance of art and (regional) culture and the power of the collective. Although the audience was enthusiastic about the play, not every one could appreciate the explicit normative message on bird protection

Play by Sholeh Wolpé
Sholeh Wolpé's play, The conference of the Birds, was commissioned and performed by The Ubuntu Theater Project in Oakland, California in the United States. It went on stage Nov 30 - Dec. 16, 2018.  The play was directed by Giulio Cesare Perrone.

The play was hailed as   "Philosophical, poetical and richly theatrical"   by Sam Hurwitt, Mercury News, and  “Moving, entertaining... breathtakingly magical”  by Theatrius.

Play by Peter Brook and Jean-Claude Carrière 
Peter Brook and Jean-Claude Carrière's play, La Conférence des oiseaux,  was staged in 1979 and performed it various countries. In 2012, an adapted version was performed by the Folger theatre.

Dance by ANIKAYA Dance Theater 
In the Spring of 2018, with support from a Building Bridges grant from the Doris Duke Foundation for Islamic Art, a Live Arts Boston grant from The Boston Foundation, an In the Lab grant from Theater Communications Group, a Jacob’s Pillow Choreographers’ Residency, and commissioned by the Boston Center for the Arts  ANIKAYA Dance Theater premiered The Conference of the Birds. Conference of the Birds is an evening-length movement theater work inspired by the epic poem of Farid Ud din Attar, and embodying stories gathered from modern-day refugees and other migrants. The dance was based on the new and modern translation of the work by poet and playwright Sholeh Wolpé, published by W. W. Norton & Co. The piece by directed and Choreographed by Wendy Jehlan. The music was composed by Shah Andalibi. The dancers were drawn from many countries around the world.

Dance theatre by Hafiz Karmali 

Hafiz Karmali, Brandeis Theater Company’s guest director of “The Conference of the Birds,” was in production at the Laurie Theater through November 2014. For all of its cultural, spiritual and religious symbolism, the performance also aims to be fun, Karmali says. “It’s written in a way that’s very lively and humorous, and we haven’t shied away from that,” he says. “This isn’t a church event, it’s fast paced dance theatre.” The production is a collaboration of the Department of Theater Arts, the Peacebuilding and the Arts Program and MusicUnitesUS. Cynthia Cohen, director of the Peacebuilding and the Arts Program, learned of Karmali's work through the Acting Together Project, which focuses on using performance art to build peace.

References 

Musicals